Bhaktavatsala Perumal temple may refer to:

 Bhaktavatsala Perumal temple, Thirunindravur 
 Bhaktavatsala Perumal temple, Tirukannamangai